The 2014 Clemson Tigers football team represented Clemson University in the 2014 NCAA Division I FBS football season. The Tigers were led by head coach Dabo Swinney in his sixth full year and seventh overall since taking over midway through 2008 season. They played their home games at Memorial Stadium, also known as "Death Valley." They were members of the Atlantic Division of the Atlantic Coast Conference. They finished the season 10–3, 6–2 in ACC play to finish in second place in the Atlantic Division. They were invited to the Russell Athletic Bowl where they defeated Oklahoma.

Personnel

Coaching staff

Schedule

Depth chart

Recruiting class

Game summaries

Georgia

South Carolina State

Florida State

North Carolina

NC State

Louisville

Boston College

Syracuse

Wake Forest

Georgia Tech

Georgia State

South Carolina

Oklahoma (Russell Athletic Bowl)

Rankings

2015 NFL Draft
Clemson had five players selected in the 2015 NFL draft. Vic Beasley was picked first at 8th overall.

Undrafted signees
In addition to five draft picks, four more Clemson Tigers made it into the NFL as undrafted rookies.

Awards

Preseason All-ACC Offense
Fourth Team

•Wayne Gallman - Running Back

•Charone Peake - Wide Receiver

Preseason All-ACC Defense
First Team

•Vic Beasley - Defensive End

•Grady Jarrett - Defensive Tackle

•Stephone Anthony - Linebacker

Third Team

•Corey Crawford - Defensive End

•Jayron Kearse - Safety

Fourth Team

•Tony Steward - Linebacker

Preseason All-ACC Special Teams
Fourth Team

•Adam Humphries - Punt Returner

References

Clemson
Clemson Tigers football seasons
Cheez-It Bowl champion seasons
Clemson Tigers football